Phacelia monoensis is an uncommon species of phacelia known by the common name Mono County phacelia.

Distribution
It is native to the Great Basin plateaus east of the Sierra Nevada in Mono County, California, and central western Nevada. It grows in sagebrush, on wooded slopes, and on open expanses of alkaline clay soils.

It is apparently most abundant in disturbed areas, such as along road cuts and in areas of mining activity.

Description
It is glandular and coated lightly in hairs.

References

External links
Phacelia monoensis. Jepson eFlora.
Phacelia monoensis. NatureServe.
CalPhotos.
 

monoensis
Flora of California
Flora of Nevada
Flora of the Great Basin
Natural history of Mono County, California
Plants described in 1981